Paul Joseph Perrault (December 3, 1924 – July 29, 2010) was an American ski jumper. He competed in the normal hill even at the 1948 Winter Olympics and placed 15th. He would also qualify for the 1952 Winter Olympics, but had to withdraw due to a back injury.

Perrault was born in Green Bay, Wisconsin, later moving to Ishpeming, Michigan. He served in the United States Army during World War II with the 10th Mountain Division based out of Camp Hale in Colorado, earning a Silver Star for his service. He was inducted into the U.S. Ski Jumping Hall of Fame in 1971.

References

1924 births
2010 deaths
American male ski jumpers
Sportspeople from Green Bay, Wisconsin
Military personnel from Wisconsin
Olympic ski jumpers of the United States
Ski jumpers at the 1948 Winter Olympics
United States Army soldiers
United States Army personnel of World War II
Recipients of the Silver Star